Don't Leave may refer to:

 "Don't Leave" (Faithless song), 1996
 "Don't Leave" (Snakehips and MØ song), 2017
 "Don't Leave", a song by Above & Beyond from the 2019 album Flow State
 "Don't Leave", a song by Seven Lions and Ellie Goulding from the 2014 EP Worlds Apart

See also
 Don't Go (disambiguation)
 Don't Leave Me (disambiguation)
 Don't Leave Me Alone (disambiguation)
 I Don't Wanna Leave (disambiguation)